This is a list of earthquakes in 1976. Only earthquakes of magnitude 6 or above are included, unless they result in damage and/or casualties, or are notable for some other reason.  All dates are listed according to UTC time. Maximum intensities are indicated on the Mercalli intensity scale and are sourced from United States Geological Survey (USGS) ShakeMap data. The main point of note from this year was the devastation seen across the globe from several catastrophic events. Several countries experienced their worst ever natural disasters. Chronologically, Guatemala in February suffered 23,000 deaths. Indonesia in June had an earthquake causing 6,000 deaths. China in July had officially 242,000 deaths from the 1976 Tangshan earthquake. This was the worst toll from an earthquake for over 400 years. Shortly afterwards the Philippines had 8,000 fatalities. Towards the year end Turkey had an event resulting in 5,000 deaths. Although not as devastating Italy had nearly 1,000 deaths in May with subsequent aftershocks causing further destruction.

By death toll

Listed are earthquakes with at least 10 dead.

By magnitude

Listed are earthquakes with at least 7.0 magnitude.

By month

January

February

March

April

May

June

July

August

September

October

November

December

References

1976
 
1976